Verconia norba is a species of colorful sea slug, a dorid nudibranch, a shell-less marine gastropod mollusk in the family Chromodorididae.

Distribution 
This species is found throughout the tropical Indo-West Pacific.

Description
The length of the body varies between 7 mm and 25 mm. In this species the mantle can vary in color from reddish purple to pinkish orange. The mantle border is creamy white. Just inside the mantle border are a series of reddish purple streaks or smudged marks which are a more vibrant purple than the main body color. Along the midline of the animal is a white patch that matches the white border. This patch sometimes encircles the gills and extends anteriorly between the rhinophores. The line is often broken into two patches anterior-posteriorly.  The rhinophores and branchia (gills) have an orange-red tint. Identifying individual purple sea slugs within the genus Noumea can be challenging because purple forms exist in several related species.

Ecology
The food source for this species has not been definitely identified, however this species has been found on coralline alga, which may prove to be part of its diet.

References

 Marcus, E. & Marcus, E. 1970. Opisthobranch Mollusks from the Southern Tropical Pacific. Pacific Science 24: 155-179
 Debelius, H. & Kuiter, R.H. 2007. Nudibranchs of the world. Frankfurt : IKAN-Unterwasserarchiv.

External links 
Noumea norba on Sea Slug Forum
Noumea norba on Nudipixel
 

 

Chromodorididae
Gastropods described in 1970